Yaqeen Ka Safar is a Pakistani television drama series produced by Momina Duraid through MD Productions for Hum TV. It aired from 19 April 2017 to 1 November 2017, with a total of 29 episodes. It was written by Farhat Ishtiaq, based on Ishtiaq's novel Woh Yakeen Ka Naya Safar and was directed by Shahzad Kashmiri.

Yaqeen Ka Safar chronicles the journey of two protagonists Asfand and Zubiya, who grow after facing hardships and struggle. It was written and produced by the creators of Humsafar, Mata-e-Jaan Hai Tu, Diyar-e-Dil, Udaari and Bin Roye. Its ensemble cast consists of Ahad Raza Mir as Dr. Asfandyar, Sajal Aly as Dr. Zubia, Shaz Khan as Daniyal and Hira Mani as Gaiti in leading roles. It premiered in Pakistan, the UK, the US, Australia, New Zealand, Ireland, and UAE with the same date and timings.

Yaqeen Ka Safar was one of the highest ranked drama in Pakistan the year it was released.

Plot
Yaqeen Ka Safar'''s story starts with Zubia Khalil, a young girl mourning her mother's sudden death at the hands of her physically violent father. Zubia needed to visit a friend's house to borrow important lecture notes and insisted her mother accompany her, despite her mother being forbidden by her father to leave the house with their driver. When Khalil discovered Zubia’s mother disobeyed this order, he slapped her so hard she fell and ended up hitting the corner of her bed, killing her instantly. Zubia’s aunt Mahjabeen Khala arrives and consoles the deeply devastated Zubia. Khalil threatens Zubiya's whole family in an attempt to silence them regarding the cause of their mother's death.

The second story-line involves a family in Islamabad celebrating their son Daniyal's wedding to his cousin Gaiti Ara. Daniyal is a young lawyer who has recently graduated from London and is an extremely fearless confident brave and honest person who always stands for what’s right. Asfandyar is Daniyal's younger brother who will soon leave for Karachi to complete his medical studies after his brother's wedding. He is a lively person and quite ambitious as well. The family maintains a significant reputation in the community as Usman, Daniyal and Asfandyar's father, is a successful lawyer, too. Asfandyar is engaged to his other cousin Faryal, the only daughter of Usman's brother, Rizwan.

The third story-line involves Noori, a naive young girl living in a rural village of Sindh (Rab Nawaz.) Tragically, Noori is kidnapped by a minister's son, Jahangir Shah, who gang-rapes her along with two of his friends. She is rescued the next day by a man who brings her to a hospital, where the doctor calls her family and informs them of the incident. A police asks Noori how this happened, and asks her quite inappropriate questions if she had an affair with that guy and if she invited the rape. Noori’s brother stands up for Noori and tells the police officer to shut up. Eventually, the family decides to remain silent because their poverty means they are unable to afford legal action against a powerful minister. While Noori's father does go to the police station to report Jahangir Shah for raping Noori, he is threatened by the police. After the incident, Noori's family is insulted in the village, so Noori decides to take revenge on Jahangir and his friends. Noori runs away from her house, she is then found by and taken to Karachi by Rumana, an NGO lady in Karachi. Rumana informs Daniyal about the Noori gang-rape incident.

Zubia’s sister-in-law Sheema overhears Zubia talking to Rameez and starts plotting against her so that she can take her revenge from her father in law, Khalil, as he insulted her parents who agreed to get Sheema's sister married according to her liking. Zubia  wanted to secretly marry Rameez so that their family is left with no choice but to accept them and their love. But when Zubia goes to his house, she finds out his true intentions as he puts a drug in Zubiya's juice so that he can easily abuse her. Zubiya senses that something is wrong and as soon as the abuse begins, she instantly runs out from his flat and Asfandyar saves her. Her family gets worried as they wait for her to come back. As Sheema knows about their plans, she shows Rehan and Khalil Zubia’s conversation with Rameez, thus succeeding in destroying Khalil's reputation. From here Zubia was greatly abused by her family and her friends broke all ties with her. Here Khalil realises that because of his sins, Allah is punishing his daughter, and wonders how he can be forgiven or help Zubia regain her respect. She repents to Allah, and says sorry to Zubia and she forgives him. Zubia’s dad moved on and forgot her mistake, however Zubia’s brother Rehan didn’t forgive her.

Daniyal travels to Karachi, meets Noori, and decides to file a case against Jahangir Shah and his friends. Daniyal starts receiving threats and is even thrown into prison based on the false accusations that he raped his secretary, Urooj Nisar, who was secretly working for Jahangir Shah. He is bailed out the next day and his family tries to force him to close the case but he doesn't. Some days later, while Daniyal is in his office, he is shot by Jahangir Shah's people, who had also killed one of Daniyal's loyal friends who has been helping him throughout the case. These people also destroy all the proof that Daniyal had collected to present in court and typed up a note, supposedly from Daniyal himself, stating that Daniyal was too scared to deal with this case anymore and that he is leaving everyone forever. This leaves people thinking that he gave up and committed suicide. Everyone receives this news the next morning and the family is left in extreme pain. Noori's state of agony intensifies and she secretly takes a gun from the security guard. She then attends Jahangir Shah's conference and kills her rapist.

Meanwhile, Asfandyar and Faryal's engagement ends as Faryal and her parents refuse to believe that Daniyal was innocent and did not commit suicide. After all of this, Asfandyar decides to leave for America to complete his education, while Faryal gets married to someone else and settles abroad. Gaiti gives birth to her and Daniyal's son, Saim. This event finally brings some smiles to the family members faces and they slowly start healing from the past. On the other hand, because of the bad behaviour of her father, Zubia rebels and starts dating her stalker named Rameez.

Despite Rehan and Sheema’s arguments, Khalil gets her admitted to a medical college as it was her mother's wish that she becomes a doctor. As soon as she was about to complete her MBBS and her marriage was fixed, Khalil dies. After a few months, Sheema’s cousin from abroad came to visit her and takes interest in Zubia. In the middle of the night, he, without Zubia’s consent, enters her room and walks closer to her. Zubia yells and after Rehan and Sheema find them in the room together, the man falsely accuses Zubia of calling him to repair her laptop and asking him for sexual favours. Zubia stands up for herself and tells her brother that when it was my fault, I didn't argue one bit, but now, I will not bear these lies and unjust treatment I am given. Zubia’s brother refuses to believe her and he and Zubia’s sister in law throw Zubia of the house at night. Zubia, with no place to go went to her aunt Mahjabin's home in Peshawar who believes her. Zubia lives there for a few weeks but because her cousin’s wife’s behaviour isn’t good with her, and she thought aunt's son and daughter in law's lives are being disturbed, she leaves and joins a hostel. She gives a job interview with Asfandyar’s newly established hospital. Where she instantly feels as if she has already seen him somewhere.

From day one, she is scolded a lot by Dr. Asfandyar and that's why she also calls him Hitler and Changez Khan. Asfandyar is now very intelligent but very arrogant. His brother's death resulted in him becoming a bitter person. Zubia and Gaiti (wife of Daniyal) become best  friends after meeting in a nearby sitting area. Zubia talks to Gaiti about Asfandyar being Hitler, Zubia tells her about her boss not knowing that Asfandyar is Gaiti’s brother in law. When Zubiya learns that he is also the brother in law of Gaiti she became angry and didn't talk to Gaiti as she blames her for not telling her this and believes that now Asfandyar will think as if  Dr. Zubiya is trying to impress his family to gain benefits and profit in her job. Gaiti tells Zubia that it doesn’t matter and outside of the hospital Zubia can be anyone’s family member and she can also be a part of anyone’s family. After a few days, they make up with each other.  Zubia searched and found that he was the person who saved her from Rameez. Gaiti also tells her all about her family, Asfandyar and Daniyal. After some time Zubia realizes that Gaeti and Dr. Haroon (Zubia colleague) can marry as Dr. Haroon also lost his dearest wife in an accident just like Gaiti lost Daniyal. On the other hand, Asfandyar's family wants him to marry Zubia. Everyone in Asfandyar’s family loves Zubia and Asfandyar’s mom thinks of Zubia as her daughter. Everyone becomes close to Zubia in a short time because of her positive nature, Gaiti left behind her trauma of Daniyal's death and started to socialize.

Here as Zubia is slowly improving her performance as a doctor, she and Asfandyar establish good terms with one another and soon fall in love. In the meantime, Faryal came back and she wishes to marry Asfandyar because her husband divorced her and that she regrets her ill-treatment with Asfandyar during that difficult phase. But Asfandyar did not agree to marry her and she went back to her home. Here, Urooj Nisar who was Daniyal ex-secretary and accused him of raping her, comes to the hospital with her injured son who met a car accident as he was drunk. Asfandyar identifies who she is, right in the first sight, so does she. He locks himself in his office and cries remembering his brother. He performs surgery on Urooj's son without taking a single penny from her. In extreme guilt, Urooj calls upon a press conference and confesses all her crimes and ask for forgiveness. Everyone from Zubia, to Faryal and her parents, everyone saw it on the media and Daniyal's family finally feels proud that their son lost his life in trying to protect humanity. Asfandyar and his father travel and visit Daniyal's grave and attend a seminar which is held to honour Daniyal. After he returned, he proposes to Zubiya but she rejects the proposal saying that temporary infatuation doesn't mean you can get married. She does this because she has lied a lot about her past to everyone and believes that when Asfi will end up remembering the Rameez incident, he will leave Zubia thinking that she is a characterless woman. Both are heartbroken. Rehan, on the other hand, wakes up in the middle of the night and wishes to ask forgiveness from Zubia. So he comes to the hospital to meet her. Zubia notices him and gets very tensed and thought that now everyone will find out that she lied about not having a brother, and her family. She becomes hopeless and flees from the hospital. Asfandyar  locates her and finds her standing high up on the cliff, below which is a lake. Asfandyar is shocked and runs to save her but she had jumped into the lake, and thus committing suicide. Asfandyar without a second thought risks his life to save hers, he rescues her before she could drown completely. Asfandyar then brought her to the hospital while she remained unconscious. Here he finds about her, and reprimands Zubia brother for ill treating Zubia and confesses his love and adoration for her. After Zubia gains consciousness Asfandyar tells her that he doesn't care about anything but only her  and wants to spend the rest of his life with her. They tearfully hug. Rehan is also forgiven by Zubia. Dr. Haroon and Gaiti happily are married too. In a voiceover Zubia mentions that in a few days it would be a whole year since she and Asfandyar have been married, and that all the hardships and challenges Allah had in store for you, he also rewards you with blessings in return. In the end, everything was worth it and happened for a reason. The show ends with the moss green SUV of Asfandyar vanishing from the sight as he and his Zubia are out on their journey with "Ek Naya Aghaaz" flashing on screen before the curtain falls.

 Cast 
Main cast
 Ahad Raza Mir as Dr. Asfandyar Ali Khan
 Sajal Aly as Dr. Zubiya Khalil/Dr.Zubiya Asfandyar Ali Khan
 Hira Mani as Gaeti Daniyal Ali Khan
 Shaz Khan as Barrister Daniyal Ali Khan
 Farhan Ali Agha as Barrister Usman Ali Khan
 Suhaee Abro as Noori

Supporting cast
 Mohammed Ehteshamuddin as Khalil Ehteshamuddin
 Beenish Raja as Sheema Rehan
 Afraz Rasool as Rehan Khalil
 Sabeena Syed as Faryaal
 Aisha Khan Jr. as Urooj Nisar
 Shamyl Khan as Dr. Shahroze
 Shamayel Tareen as Dr. Asifa Shahroze
 Salman Saqib Sheikh as Dr. Haroon
 Nasreen Naz as Noori's mother
 Ismail Chandio as Noori's father
 Ali Gul Mallah as Rab Nawaz's assistant
 Sabiha Sumar as Lubna
 Huma Nawab as Mahjabeen, Zubia's aunt
 Annie Zaidi as Gaeti's mother
 Munazzah Arif as Rukhsana, Faryaal's mother
 Nabeel Zuberi as Ramiz, Zubia's boyfriend
 Agha Talal as Mohsin, Mahjabeen's son
 Zia Gurchani as Gaeti's father
 Javed Iqbal as Faryaal's father
 Akbar Islam as SSP Shehzad Ahmed
 Naima Khan as Jehangir's mother
 Fazila Qazi as Maah-e-Talat, Zubia's mother
 Zainab Qayyum as Rumana, Women activist
 Jahanzeb Gurchani as Rab Nawaz
 Mariyam Nafees as Khajista
 Hassan Noman as Bahadur, Khajista's husband
 Ismat Zaidi as Zubia's grandmother
 Nawal Saeed as Misbah, Zubia's friend
 Ibrahim Salman as Saim, Daniyal and Gaeti's son

Production
DevelopmentYakeen Ka Safar was developed by Hum TV's senior producer Momina Duraid of MD Productions, the channel hired the director Shahzad Kashmiri who previously directed Bin Roye for the same channel. Along with Kashmiri, Mirza Zeeshan Baig was finalised as the art director, it was Baig's return to Hum Television after he directed Diyar-e-Dil, Mann Mayal, Sanam, Dil Banjaara and Alif Allah Aur Insaan for the same channel. Tameen Nazami and Safdar Hussain Rind were the cinematographers. The story of the serial is based on award-winning writer Farhat Ishtiaq's novel Woh Yakeen Ka Ek Naya Safar. The screenplay was also written by Ishtiaq while script composing was done by Muhammad Wasi-ul-Din who has previously worked with her with the channel's series Diyar-e-Dil and Bin Roye. Farhat has previously worked in Momina, where she wrote mega-hit drama serials in Pakistan television history Humsafar,  Mata-e-Jaan Hai Tu, Diyar-e-Dil,. Bin Roye and Udaari. Song composition is done by Waqar Ali and Suhail Haider while the background score is given by MAD Music, Hadiqa Kiani and Richa Sharma finalised to perform the OST. Yaqeen Ka Safar is the second collaboration of writer and director after 2015's hit film Bin Roye. show approximately airs weekly episode for 35–40 minutes (minus commercials) every Wednesday.

There were several discussions laid on its time slot, previously it was announced that the show will premier on 12 April 2017, airing an episode on Friday's replacing Dil Banjaara. However, since Dil-e-Jaanam bought lower ratings to channel's Wednesday slot, Yakeen Ka Safar was shifted to Wednesdays and was delayed till 15 April 2017, due to promotional reasons.

Casting

Sajal Aly, Ahad Raza Mir, Shaz Khan and Hira Salman were selected to portray the leading roles of Zubiya, Asfandyar, Daniyal and Gaeti.

Aly made her television comeback two years after her 2015 TV series Gul-e-Rana. After completing her Bollywood debut Mom, the actress returned to portray the role of Dr. Zubiya and also signed O Rangreza for the same channel. Mir who made his television debut in Sammi was finalised after his success as portraying the role of Salar in Sammi. The actor received critical acclaim and appraisal for his role as Dr. Asfandyar.

Film actor Shaz Khan was finalised to portray the role of Daniyal during his filming session in channel's upcoming film Parwaaz Hay Junoon. While Salman returned to the network after her 2015 TV serial Preet Na Kariyo Koi for portraying the role of Geeti, Salman joined filming after completing her ARY project Sun Yaara, alongside Salman her husband Mani was also cast where he portrayed the role of Dr. Haroon.

The production house also chose actors Farhan Ali Agha, Mohammed Ehteshamuddin, and Maryam Nafees to play the roles of Usman, Noori, Khalil and Khajista.

Release
BroadcastYakeen Ka Safar premiered on 19 April 2017 and aired weekly, with a new episode being broadcast every Wednesday at 8:00pm.

The show aired on Hum Europe in the UK, Hum TV USA in USA and Hum TV Mena in UAE, with the same times and premiere date. It was broadcast by Hum Network's new channel Hum World HD for US and Canada.

It rebroadcast on Hum TV in Pakistan premiering 8 October 2018 at 10pm slot. In 2019, It also aired on national channel PTV Home started in August 2019 airing two episodes  (Friday and Saturday) a week.

A dubbed version is currently airing on Hum Pashto 1 in Pashto under the title دباور سفر.

Home media and digital releaseYakeen Ka Safar was also released on Hum TV's YouTube channel alongside its airing but later the channel deleted all its episodes. It was also released on the iflix as a part of the channel's contract, later on terminated the contract in 2019, all episodes were pulled off and thus could not be streamed digitally anymore.

Later Yakeen Ka Safar was also released on OTT the platform MX Player. In July 2019, the channel re-uploaded all episodes on YouTube. A few episodes are also available on Amazone Prime Video.

 Music 

The title song of Yakeen Ka Safar was composed by Waqar Ali, while Naseer Tarbani penned the series.

The background score for the series is done by Mad Music. The OST was performed by Hadiqa Kiani. It marks the return of the singer to Hum TV since performing the OST for the channel's hit drama series Udaari in 2016.

The OST "Mitti kay Parindey' was composed by Syed Suhail Haider and its lyrics were written by Kashif Anwar. The OST was performed by Richa Sharma.

Track listing

 Reception 
The serial received critical praise especially for the storyline, cinematography and performances of the star cast.

While praising the refreshing storyline without much romantic angle and multiple themes of the series, Express Tribune wrote, "Yaqeen Ka Safar is honest and original, and has changed the paradigm of Pakistani dramas." While reviewing positively, Buraq Shabbir of The News said it as more realistic than other serials aired at that time stating, "It views people as professionals while tapping into their personal lives as well, making it more relatable". DAWN Images'' praised the Mir's complex and nuanced portrayal of Dr. Asfandyar.

Awards and nominations

See also
List of programs broadcast by Hum TV
2017 in Pakistani television

References

External links 

 Official website

Pakistani drama television series
2017 Pakistani television series debuts
2017 Pakistani television series endings
Urdu-language television shows
Television series based on the novels of Farhat Ishtiaq
Pakistani medical television series
Television shows set in Islamabad